Mackenzie Lynne Dern Santos (born March 24, 1993) is an American professional mixed martial artist and Brazilian Jiu-Jitsu practitioner. She is a former world No. 1 ranked IBJJF competitor, currently ranked 6th among the female divisions. She is an ADCC and no gi BJJ (black belt) World Champion. As of November 8, 2022, she is #7 in the UFC women's strawweight rankings.

Early life
Dern was born in Arizona, the daughter of Wellington "Megaton" Dias, a highly decorated grappling competitor himself. As a child, she grew up travelling back and forth between Arizona and her father's native Brazil. Dern is fluent in English and Portuguese. She has stated that Portuguese has become her primary tongue, explaining that "my Dad and step Mom are both Brazilian. My boyfriend speaks Portuguese. I'm speaking Portuguese more than English. I still have lots of interactions in English of course. But I think in Portuguese, anything to do with fight is all in Portuguese in my mind, I dream in Portuguese."

Dern began training by the age of three and practicing with her father and stepmother who is also a black belt, Luciana Tavares. Mackenzie started competing at a young age, and began competing in the adult divisions at 14 years old. She has won a world championship in every belt level as she progressed to black belt rank, which was awarded to her by her father in December 2012, three months prior to her 20th birthday. She graduated from Ironwood High School in Glendale, Arizona.

Due to her six 1st place finishes at the Asian Open, Mackenzie is the only female Jiu-Jitsu competitor to have won Gold Medals, at Black Belt level, at each of the 5 principal/highest ranking IBJJF Gi Championships - the other events are the Worlds, the Euros, the Pan Ams and the Brazilian Nationals. One of her biggest achievements in BJJ came when she managed to defeat Gabi Garcia despite a huge weight difference, becoming one of the few women to do so.

Mixed martial arts

Legacy Fighting Alliance
Dern was scheduled to make her mixed martial arts debut against Kenia Rosas at Legacy FC 58. She won her debut by unanimous decision.

Dern was scheduled to fight Montana De La Rosa at Legacy FC 61. The bout was initially scheduled to be contested at strawweight, but was later changed to catchweight, as Dern missed weight by 2.8 lbs. She won the fight by a first round submission.

Dern was scheduled to fight Katherine Roy at LFA 6. Dern came in overweight for the second time in a row, missing weight by four pounds, and had to forfeit 20% of her purse. She won the fight by unanimous decision.

Dern moved up to flyweight for her fourth professional fight, being scheduled to fight Mandy Polk at LFA 24. She beat Polk by a first-round rear-naked choke.

After going 4–0 in her first four professional fights, Dern signed with Invicta Fighting Championship in November 2017.

Invicta Fighting Championship 
Dern made her Invicta debut on December 8, 2017, at Invicta FC 26: Maia vs. Niedzwiedz against Kaline Medeiros. She won the fight via an armbar in round three.

Ultimate Fighting Championship 
Dern made her promotional debut against Ashley Yoder on March 3, 2018, at UFC 222. She won the fight via split decision.

Dern faced Amanda Cooper on May 12, 2018 at UFC 224. At the weigh-ins, Dern weighed in at 123 pounds, 7 pounds over the strawweight non-title fight upper limit of 116 pounds. As a result, the bout proceeded at catchweight and Dern was fined 30% of her purse. Dern won the fight via submission through a rear naked choke in the first round.

After a hiatus from maternity leave, Dern faced Amanda Ribas on October 12, 2019 at UFC on ESPN+ 19. She lost the fight via unanimous decision.

Dern was expected to face Ariane Carnelossi on April 25, 2020 at UFC Fight Night 173. Carnelossi was forced to withdraw from the bout due to travel restriction.

Dern was scheduled to face Hannah Cifers  on April 25, 2020. However, on April 9 the promotion announced that this event was postponed. The pairing eventually took place on May 30, 2020 at UFC on ESPN: Woodley vs. Burns. Dern won the fight with a first round kneebar - becoming the first woman  to finish a fight by any form of leg lock in UFC history. This win also earned her her first Performance of the Night award.

Dern faced Randa Markos on September 19, 2020 at UFC Fight Night 178. She won the fight via submission in the first round. This win earned her her second straight Performance of the Night award.

Dern faced Virna Jandiroba on December 12, 2020 at UFC 256. Dern won the fight by unanimous decision.

Dern faced Nina Nunes on April 10, 2021 at UFC on ABC 2. She won the bout via first round armbar. This win earned her a Performance of the Night award.

Dern faced Marina Rodriguez on October 9, 2021 on UFC Fight Night 194. She lost the fight via unanimous decision. This fight earned her the Fight of the Night award.

Dern faced Tecia Torres on April 9, 2022 at UFC 273. Dern defeated Torres in a close bout by split decision.

Dern faced Yan Xiaonan on October 1, 2022 at UFC Fight Night 211. She lost the bout via majority decision.

Dern is scheduled to face  Angela Hill on May 13, 2023 at UFC Fight Night 224.

Personal life 
Dern was married to professional surfer Wesley Santos. They separated in 2022.

In February 2019, Dern announced that she had put her MMA career on hold due to pregnancy. Her daughter, Moa, was born on June 9, 2019.

According to Dern, she left Black House MMA after a reported incident concerning her original coach, Juan Gomez, where he got into a physical altercation with her husband over a disagreement about money. However, Gomez disputed money being the reason and subsequently both Dern and Gomez were asked to leave the team.

Championships and accomplishments

Mixed martial arts
Ultimate Fighting Championship
Performance of the Night (Three times) 
Fight of the Night (One time) 
Most submission wins in the UFC Strawweight division (four)
Second-most submission wins in the UFC among women (four)

Mixed martial arts record

|-
|Loss
|align=center|12–3
|Yan Xiaonan
|Decision (majority)
|UFC Fight Night: Dern vs. Yan
|
|align=center|5
|align=center|5:00
|Las Vegas, Nevada, United States
|
|-
|Win
|align=center|12–2
|Tecia Torres
|Decision (split)
|UFC 273
|
|align=center|3
|align=center|5:00
|Jacksonville, Florida, United States
|
|-
|Loss
|align=center|11–2
|Marina Rodriguez
|Decision (unanimous)
|UFC Fight Night: Dern vs. Rodriguez
|
|align=center|5
|align=center|5:00
|Las Vegas, Nevada, United States
|
|-
|Win
|align=center|11–1
|Nina Nunes
|Submission (armbar)
|UFC on ABC: Vettori vs. Holland
|
|align=center|1
|align=center|4:48
|Las Vegas, Nevada, United States
|
|-
|Win
|align=center|10–1
|Virna Jandiroba
|Decision (unanimous)
|UFC 256
|
|align=center|3
|align=center|5:00
|Las Vegas, Nevada, United States
|
|-
|Win
|align=center|9–1
|Randa Markos
|Submission (armbar)
|UFC Fight Night: Covington vs. Woodley
|
|align=center|1
|align=center|3:44
|Las Vegas, Nevada, United States
|
|-
|Win
|align=center|8–1
|Hannah Cifers
|Submission (kneebar)
|UFC on ESPN: Woodley vs. Burns
|
|align=center|1
|align=center|2:36
|Las Vegas, Nevada, United States
|
|-
|Loss
|align=center|7–1
|Amanda Ribas
|Decision (unanimous)
|UFC Fight Night: Joanna vs. Waterson
|
|align=center|3
|align=center|5:00
|Tampa, Florida, United States
|
|-
|Win
|align=center|7–0
|Amanda Cooper
|Submission (rear-naked choke)
|UFC 224
|
|align=center|1
|align=center|2:27
|Rio de Janeiro, Brazil
|
|- 
|Win
|align=center|6–0
|Ashley Yoder
|Decision (split)
|UFC 222
|
|align=center|3
|align=center|5:00
|Las Vegas, Nevada, United States
|
|-
|Win
|align=center|5–0
|Kaline Medeiros
|Submission (armbar)
|Invicta FC 26: Maia vs. Niedzwiedz
|
|align=center|3
|align=center|4:45
|Kansas City, Missouri, United States
|
|-
|Win
|align=center|4–0
|Mandy Polk 
|Submission (rear-naked choke)
|LFA 24
|
|align=center|1
|align=center|2:55
|Phoenix, Arizona, United States
|
|-
|Win
|align=center|3–0
|Katherine Roy 
|Decision (unanimous)
|LFA 6
|
|align=center|3
|align=center|5:00
|San Antonio, Texas, United States
|
|-
|Win
|align=center|2–0
|Montana De La Rosa
|Submission (rear-naked choke)
|Legacy FC 61
|
|align=center|1
|align=center|3:25
|Dallas, Texas, United States
|
|-
|Win
|align=center|1–0
|Kenia Rosas
|Decision (unanimous)
|Legacy FC 58
|
|align=center|3
|align=center|5:00
|Lake Charles, Louisiana, United States
|
|-

Grappling record
Records as per BJJHeroes website.

Instructor lineage
Mitsuyo "Count Koma" Maeda → Carlos Gracie, Sr. → Helio Gracie → Royler Gracie → Wellington "Megaton" Dias → Mackenzie Dern

References

External links
 
 

1993 births
Living people
Sportspeople from Phoenix, Arizona
American sportspeople of Brazilian descent
American practitioners of Brazilian jiu-jitsu
People awarded a black belt in Brazilian jiu-jitsu
Female Brazilian jiu-jitsu practitioners
Mixed martial artists from Arizona
American female mixed martial artists
Strawweight mixed martial artists
Flyweight mixed martial artists
Mixed martial artists utilizing Brazilian jiu-jitsu
Ultimate Fighting Championship female fighters
World Brazilian Jiu-Jitsu Championship medalists
Brazilian jiu-jitsu world champions (women)
World No-Gi Brazilian Jiu-Jitsu Championship medalists
21st-century American women
Brazilian jiu-jitsu practitioners who have competed in MMA (women)
ADCC Submission Fighting World Champions (women)